Stephen Bruce Fowdy (September 16, 1915 – January 23, 1995) was an American professional basketball player. He played in the National Basketball League in one game for the Hammond Ciesar All-Americans, yet failed to register a single statistic.

References

1915 births
1995 deaths
American men's basketball players
United States Army Air Forces personnel of World War II
Basketball players from Indiana
Forwards (basketball)
High school basketball coaches in the United States
Hammond Ciesar All-Americans players
Whiting High School alumni
People from Whiting, Indiana